Men's Slalom World Cup 1982/1983

Calendar

Final point standings
In Men's Slalom World Cup 1982/83 the best 5 results count.

Men's Slalom Team Results
All points were shown including individuel deduction. bold indicate highest score - italics indicate race wins

References
 fis-ski.com

World Cup
FIS Alpine Ski World Cup slalom men's discipline titles